William Dalen Clyburn (born May 17, 1990) is an American professional basketball player for Anadolu Efes of the Turkish Basketball Super League and the EuroLeague. Clyburn attended three colleges, from 2008 to 2013: Marshalltown Community College, University of Utah, and Iowa State University before playing professionally in Germany, Israel, Turkey, and Russia. He was the top scorer in the Israel Basketball Premier League in 2015–16. Clyburn was named the EuroLeague Final Four MVP in 2019.

Early life and college career

Clyburn was born in Detroit, Michigan, he attended Romulus Senior High School in Romulus, Michigan, where he averaged 10.7 points as a senior, earning the "Best Shooter" award.

Clyburn began his college career at Marshalltown Community College, where he averaged 19.6 points and 8.7 rebounds per game as a sophomore. In one game, Clyburn had a 54-point outburst against Southeastern Community College. Clyburn earned first-team All-ICCAC honors and first-team All-Region XI accolades in 2010.

In 2010, he transferred to the University of Utah, where he earned Second-Team Mountain West Conference honors and First-Team NABC All-District 17 accolades after leading the team in scoring (17.1) and rebounding (7.8) per game. Clyburn was ranked third in the Mountain West in both scoring and rebounding and ranked 92nd nationally in scoring.

On April 12, 2011, he transferred again to Iowa State University and was forced to sit out the 2011–12 season as a redshirt. In his senior year at Iowa State, he was named Big 12 Newcomer of the Year and earned All-Big 12 Second Team honors. Clyburn led the team and ranked seventh in the Big 12 in scoring with 14.9 points per game.

Professional career

ratiopharm Ulm (2013–2015)
After going undrafted in the 2013 NBA draft, Clyburn joined the Sacramento Kings for the 2013 NBA Summer League, where he averaged 7.4 points and 3 rebounds in five games played for the Kings.

On July 27, 2013, Clyburn signed with ratiopharm Ulm of the German BBL. Clyburn helped Ulm reach the 2014 Eurocup Round of 16, as well as the 2014 German Cup Finals, where they eventually lost to Alba Berlin.

On July 8, 2014, Clyburn joined the Los Angeles Clippers for the 2014 NBA Summer League.

On October 18, 2014, Clyburn recorded a double-double and season-highs of 28 points and 17 rebounds, shooting 9-of-18 from the field, in a 99–85 win over MHP Riesen Ludwigsburg. In 41 games played during the 2014–15 season, he averaged 12.9 points, 7.2 rebounds, 1.5 assists and 1.2 steals per game. His solid play for the season got him an invite to play in the German League All-Star Game. Clyburn led the team to reach the 2014 BBL Playoffs as the fifth seed, but they eventually were eliminated by Brose Bamberg in the Semifinals.

Hapoel Holon (2015–2016)
On September 8, 2015, Clyburn signed with Hapoel Holon in Israeli Premier League. On April 25, 2016, Clyburn recorded 31 points, shooting 11-of-15 from the field, along with nine rebounds and three assists for 43 PIR in a 98–80 win over Maccabi Ashdod. He was subsequently named Israeli League Round 30 MVP.  On May 1, 2016, Clyburn was named Israeli League Player of the Month after averaging 25.6 points, 10.6 rebounds and 4 assists in five games played in April.

In 33 games played for Holon, Clyburn led the league in scoring with 20.9 points per game, to go with 8.2 rebounds, 2 assists and 1.4 steals per game. On June 3, 2016, Clyburn earned a spot in the All-Israeli League Second Team.

Darüşşafaka (2016–2017)
On August 5, 2016, Clyburn signed with Darüşşafaka of the Turkish Basketball Super League and the EuroLeague. On March 30, 2017, Clyburn recorded a season-high 26 points, shooting 9-of-14 from the field, along with seven rebounds in a 99–97 win over Brose Bamberg. Clyburn led Daçka to the 2017 EuroLeague Playoffs as the eighth seed, but they eventually were eliminated by Real Madrid in the Quarterfinals.

CSKA Moscow (2017–2022)

On June 20, 2017, Clyburn signed a two-year contract with the Russian team CSKA Moscow of the VTB United League and the EuroLeague. In 64 games played during the 2017–18 season, he averaged 11.9 points, 5.2 rebounds and 1.7 assists per game. Clyburn helped CSKA win the 2018 VTB United League Championship, winning his first career title.

On January 17, 2019, Clyburn recorded 20 points, shooting 6-of-13 from the field, along with eight rebounds and two steals, leading CSKA to a 77–70 comeback win over FC Bayern Munich. Clyburn was named EuroLeague Round 19 MVP. On May 9, 2019, Clyburn was named to the All-EuroLeague First Team. On May 19, 2019, Clyburn led CSKA win the 2019 EuroLeague Championship after scoring 20 points in the championship game against Anadolu Efes. He was named the EuroLeague Final Four MVP.

On June 14, 2019, Clyburn signed a three-year contract extension with CSKA. On October 25, 2019, Clyburn was ruled out for the rest of the season after he suffered an ACL injury in a match against Alba Berlin.

Anadolu Efes (2022–present)
On June 7, 2022, Clyburn signed a two-year contract with the Turkish club Anadolu Efes of the Basketball Super League and the EuroLeague, the back-to-back European champions.

Personal life
Clyburn's younger brother, Kris (born April 20, 1996) is also a professional basketball player, who currently plays for Mitteldeutscher BC of the German Basketball Bundesliga.

Career statistics

|-
| style="text-align:left;"|2014–15
| style="text-align:left;"|Ratipharm Ulm
| German League
| 41 || 29.8 || .477 || .272 || .759 || 7.2 || 1.6 || 1.2 || .3 || 13.0
|-
| style="text-align:left;"|2015–16
| style="text-align:left;"|Hapoel Holon
| Israeli League
| 33 || 36.1 || .456 || .333 || .661 || 8.3 || 2.0 || 1.4 || .5 || 20.9
|-
| style="text-align:left;"|2016–17
| style="text-align:left;"|Darüşşafaka
| EuroLeague
| 34 || 28.2 || .429 || .289 || .685 || 5.1 || 1.3 || .9 || .3 || 13.0
|-
| style="text-align:left;"|2017–18
| style="text-align:left;"|CSKA Moscow
| EuroLeague
| 36 || 26.6 || .435 || .386 || .692 || 5.9 || 1.8 || .9 || .3 || 11.6 
|-
| style="text-align:left;"| 2018–19
| style="text-align:left;"|CSKA Moscow
| EuroLeague
| 35 || 27.0 || .474 || .343 || .745 || 6.8 || 1.5 || 1.0 || .2 || 13.6
|-
| style="text-align:left;"|2019–20
| style="text-align:left;"|CSKA Moscow
| EuroLeague
| 4 || 18.5 || .500 || .364 || .727 || 5.3 || .8 || .8 || .0 || 12.5 
|-
| style="text-align:left;"|2020–21
| style="text-align:left;"|CSKA Moscow
| EuroLeague
| 31 || 26.1 || .520 || .364 || .796 || 3.8 || 1.5 || .8 || .2 || 14.0
|-
| style="text-align:left;"|2021–22
| style="text-align:left;"|CSKA Moscow
| EuroLeague
| 17 || 28.4 || .432 || .338 || .870 || 5.4 || 1.5 || .8 || .5 || 15.0
|-
|-class=sortbottom
| align="center" colspan=2 | Career
| All Leagues
| 226 || 27.8 || .458 || .329 || .720 || 6.2 || 1.6 || 1.0 || .3 || 13.8

College

|-
| style="text-align:left;"| 2010–11
| style="text-align:left;"| Utah
| 30 || 28 || 34.7 || .450 || .403 || .759 || 7.8 || 1.0 || 1.1 || .2 || 17.1
|-
| style="text-align:left;"| 2012–13
| style="text-align:left;"| Iowa State
| 35 || 35 || 31.5 || .443 || .308 || .768 || 6.8 || 2.1 || .9 || .4 || 14.9
|-
| style="text-align:center;" colspan=2| Career
| 65 || 63 || 33.0 || .446 || .359 || .764 || 7.3 || 1.6 || 1.0 || .3 || 15.9

References

External links
 Iowa State Cyclones bio
 RealGM profile
 Eurobasket profile
 EuroLeague profile
 TBLStat.net Profile
 
 

1990 births
Living people
American expatriate basketball people in Germany
American expatriate basketball people in Israel
American expatriate basketball people in Russia
American expatriate basketball people in Turkey
American men's basketball players
Anadolu Efes S.K. players
Basketball players from Detroit
Darüşşafaka Basketbol players
Hapoel Holon players
Iowa State Cyclones men's basketball players
Marshalltown Tigers men's basketball players
PBC CSKA Moscow players
Romulus Senior High School alumni
Ratiopharm Ulm players
Small forwards
Southeastern Blackhawks men's basketball players
Utah Utes men's basketball players